Maya Henri Diab (born 10 November 1980) is a Lebanese pop singer, entertainer, actress and television personality. She is a former member of the Lebanese girl group The 4 Cats.

Early life
Maya Diab, was born in Achrafieh, to a Christian Greek Orthodox family. She is the youngest of her parents' children and has one brother and two sisters. She majored in radio and TV media after receiving her university degree from the Lebanese University.

Career
In 1996, she won the golden award for Fashion at Studio El Fan, when she was 16 years old. (In 1998, she participated in Miss Lebanon. In 2000, she competed in the TV presenting category at Studio El Fan, then she joined The 4 Cats in 2001.

In 2007, she acted in Asad W Arbaa Kotat along with The 4 Cats and Hany Ramzy, then in two TV series, Kalam Niswan in 2009 and El Donia Heik الدنيا هيك in 2010. In 2010, she left The 4 Cats. In 2011, she had her first song "Habibi" and a duo-song called "Sawa" with Ramy Ayach.

Her first TV-program to present was Heik Menghanni on MTV in 2011. She later presented Deal or no deal: El Ikhtiyar on Al-Nahar in 2012 and Ask The Arabs on MBC 1 in 2016.

In October 2020, Maya Diab was named the Fashion Icon of the Arab World by the Arab Fashion Council, and she announced the opening of the 12th edition of the Arab Fashion Week, which was hosted virtually in Dubai.

Personal life
She married a businessman, Abbas Nasser, in 2006, with whom she had her daughter, Kai. The couple separated in 2017.

In January 2020, she mentioned, that she was kidnapped in Beirut in 2005, where she was held hostage and abused in a car for one day.

Discography

Studio albums

Live albums

Singles

Filmography

Film

TV Series

References

External links
 
  
 

1980 births
Living people
21st-century Lebanese women singers
Lebanese film actresses
Lebanese pop singers
Singers from Beirut
Greek Orthodox Christians from Lebanon
Lebanese University alumni
Singers who perform in Egyptian Arabic
Actresses from Beirut